Pseudonatica is a genus of predatory sea snails, marine gastropod mollusks in the family Zerotulidae.

Species
 Pseudonatica ampullarica Simone, 2018
 Pseudonatica antarctica Simone, 2018

References

External links
 Simone, L. R. L. (2018). Convergence with naticids: phenotypic phylogenetic study on some Antarctic littorinoideans, with description of the zerotulid new genus Pseudonatica, and its presence in Brazil (Mollusca, Caenogastropoda). Journal of the Marine Biological Association of the United Kingdom. 98(6): 1365-1381

Zerotulidae